"Faith of Our Fathers" is a science fiction short story by American writer Philip K. Dick, first published in the anthology Dangerous Visions (1967).

Plot summary
Tung Chien is a Vietnamese bureaucrat in a world that has been conquered by Chinese-style atheist communism, where the population is kept docile with hallucinogenic drugs. When a street vendor gives Tung an illegal anti-hallucinogen, he discovers that the Party leader has a horrible secret.

Reception
Algis Budrys said that "the first three-quarters of (the) story appear to be very good", and that although "Dick knows his hallucinogens very well", in "Faith of Our Fathers" "he makes sense only to himself".

"Faith of Our Fathers" was nominated for the 1968 Hugo Award for Best Novelette.

Dick later said about this story:

and

See also 
 A Maze of Death

Notes

External links 
 The Fictional Pharmaceuticals of Philip K. Dick
 Themes of Reality, Divinity and Humanity in the Short Stories of Philip K. Dick: an essay which touches on the story
 

1967 short stories
Short stories by Philip K. Dick
Dystopian literature
Fantasy short stories
Dangerous Visions short stories
Works about totalitarianism
Propaganda in fiction
Short stories about drugs
Religion in science fiction
Mass surveillance in fiction